This is a list of films produced by the Tollywood film industry based in Hyderabad, Telangana in 1966.

External links
 Earliest Telugu language films at IMDb.com (443 to 464)

1966
Telugu
Telugu films